Komaggas is a town in Namakwa District Municipality in the Northern Cape province of South Africa.

Settlement 40 km south-west of Springbok and 45 km north of Soebatsfontein, on the Komaggas River, a tributary of the Buffels River. Founded as a station of the London Missionary Society in 1829, it was taken over by the Rhenish Missionary Society in 1843 and by the Dutch Reformed Church in 1936. The name is variously explained as ‘abundance of maws of animals’ and ‘place of many wild olive-trees’; the latter explanation is probably correct.

References

Populated places in the Nama Khoi Local Municipality
1829 establishments in Africa